Margaret of Blois (French: Marguerite; died 1230) was suo jure Countess of Blois in France from 1218 to 1230. From 1190 to 1200, she was the countess consort of the County of Burgundy and then regent for her daughters from 1200 until 1208.

Life
She was daughter of Theobald V of Blois and Alix of France.

Margaret married three times. Her first marriage was to Hugh of Oisy, Lord of Montmirail. Her second husband was Otto I, Count of Burgundy, with whom she had two daughters:
 Joanna I, Countess of Burgundy
 Beatrice II, Countess of Burgundy
Finally, she married Walter II of Avesnes, they had:
 Theobald, died young
 Mary, Countess of Blois

References

Sources

Year of birth unknown
1170s births
1230 deaths
12th-century French people
13th-century French people
12th-century French women
13th-century French women
Countesses of Burgundy
Countesses of Luxembourg
Counts of Blois
House of Blois
13th-century women rulers
Remarried royal consorts